The flag of the Cook Islands, officially known as the Cook Islands Ensign, is based on the traditional design for former British colonies in the Pacific region. It is a blue ensign containing the Union Flag in the upper left, and on the right, fifteen stars in a ring. The Union Flag is symbolic of the nation's historic ties to the United Kingdom and to the Commonwealth of Nations. The stars stand for the fifteen islands that make up the Cook Islands (Tongareva, Rakahanga, Manihiki, Pukapuka, Nassau, Suwarrow, Palmerston, Aitutaki, Manuae, Takutea, Atiu, Mitiaro, Mauke, Rarotonga and Mangaia). The blue represents the ocean and the peaceful nature of the inhabitants.

History
A Federal Flag Bill was proposed in the Cook Islands Parliament in 1892, but was not assented to. The proposed flag had consisted of three horizontal stripes (red, white, red), with a Union Flag in the top left corner, overlaid by a black coconut palm tree on a white circle. When the islands were annexed by New Zealand in 1901, the New Zealand flag was used instead.

In 1973 a contest was held to design a new flag, with 120 entries. The winner was chosen at a meeting of the cabinet, judging panel and the flag design committee, a green ensign with 15 gold stars in a circle. The gold was to represent the "friendliness of Cook Islanders and their hope, faith, dedication, love and happiness"; the circle represented "unity and strength of purpose and the moulding of 15 islands into one united people"; the stars were "symbols of heaven, faith in god and the power that has guided Cook Islanders throughout their history"; and the green background was to represent the "nation, the vitality of the land and the people of the evergreen and lasting growth of the Cook Islands". The new flag was raised for the first time on 24 January 1974.

In 1979 it was replaced by the current flag.

Historical flags

National flags

Proposed flags

See also
 List of New Zealand flags

References

External links
 
 World Statesmen - Cook Islands

Flag
National flags
Blue Ensigns
Flags with crosses
Flags of New Zealand
Flags introduced in 1979
Cook